Canada del Cierbo is a valley and  northwestward-flowing stream originating in the Crockett Hills Regional Park and flowing to eastern San Pablo Bay near the Carquinez Strait at Tormey, Contra Costa County, California.

History
"Cierbo" is derived from the Spanish word 'Ciervo' for 'Elk' (Cervus canadensis), the creek apparently named for elk herds native to the area.

Watershed and Course 
Cañada del Cierbo Creek is a  stream beginning in Crockett Hills Regional Park in the extreme northwest Berkeley Hills. There are no named tributaries. The lower reach of Cañada del Cierbo Creek downstream of Interstate 80 is diverted underneath refinery properties.

References

External links
 Guide to San Francisco Bay Area Creeks, Oakland Museum

Rivers of Contra Costa County, California
Rivers of the San Francisco Bay Area
Rivers of Northern California